Ashram is a neoclassical band from Italy band made up of Sergio Panarella, Luigi Rubino, Alfredo Notarloberti and Leonardo Massa. Their songs typically comprise piano, violin, cello and vocals.

Discography 

 

 
 Elisewin
 For My Sun
 I′ve Lost Myself
 Forever at Your Mercy
 Spirit of the Rising Moon
 Sweet Autumn
 Lucky's Song
 Meditation Song
 Nevermore Sorrow
 She's Fiddling
 Sitar Sniff
 Fairy Wind
 Silver Eyes
 
 Shining Silver Skies
 Tango Para Mi Padre Y Marialuna
 All′Imbrunire
 Ultima Carillon
 Rose and Air
 For Each and Every Child
 Maria and the Violin's String
 IL Mostro
 Sweet Autumn, Part II
 Last Kiss
 5 Steps...
 Elizabeth
 Lullaby
 Lady
 
 
 Spirituality
 When The Moon Dance
 Un Tramonto Infinito
 Elevation
 Resurrection
 Marie's sad song
 Child's heartbeat
 Shine on me
 Elisewin 1997
 Good night
 Air
 Marilin
 Gather all your flowers

References
 [ Ashram discography] at Allmusic

External links
Official website
Ashram at myspace

Italian musical groups
Prikosnovénie artists